The Portland Seven was a group of American Muslims from the Portland, Oregon area arrested in October 2002 as part of an FBI operation attempting to close down a terrorist cell. The seven were attempting to join al Qaeda forces in their fight against the United States military and coalition forces in Afghanistan, or aiding in that attempt.

Originally referred to as "The Portland Six", Patrice Lumumba Ford, Jeffrey Leon Battle, October Martinique Lewis (Battle's ex-wife), Muhammad Ibrahim Bilal, Ahmed Ibrahim Bilal,  and Habis Abdulla al Saoub made up the original six members arrested in October 2002. In April 2003, Maher "Mike" Hawash was arrested, and the name became "The Portland Seven".

The members of the Portland Seven "were all named in the 15-count superseding indictment that included charges of conspiracy to levy war against the United States, conspiracy to provide material support and resources to al Qaeda, conspiracy to contribute services to al Qaeda and the Taliban, conspiracy to possess and discharge firearms in furtherance of crimes of violence, possessing firearms in furtherance of crimes of violence and money laundering."

Background

On September 29, 2001, Battle, Ford and al Saoub were discovered while engaged in shooting practice in a gravel pit in Skamania County, Washington, near Washougal. Also present was Ali Khalid Steitiye, who did not become an indicted member of the Portland Seven on terrorism charges but was separately charged with other crimes.

The group was discovered by Deputy Sheriff Mark Mercer, who was acting on a tip from a neighbor who had heard gunfire in the pit. Deputy Mercer let the men go after taking their names and reported the incident to the FBI. Battle was taped in a secretly-recorded conversation indicating that they had considered killing Deputy Mercer when confronted: "We was up there blowin it up.... We was lightin' it up... [W]e looked at it as worship because what our intentions were, to learn to shoot for. And a cop came up and he was like hey... you don't understand how close he was gonna get popped... yeah, we was gonna pop him." Battle later indicated they had opted not to kill the officer because he seemed "cool."  Battle, Ford, and al Saoub went on to become the core of the "Portland Seven."

According to the indictment, on October 17, 2001, Battle and al Saoub flew out of Portland International Airport en route to Afghanistan. On October 20, 2001, Ford and the two Bilals also took the same route out of the United States. Between October 2001 and January 2002, Lewis wired a series of money orders to Battle in China and Bangladesh, and in November 2001 and January 2002, Ford wired money to al Saoub in China. Ford returned to the US on or about November 19, 2001. M. Bilal returned to the U.S on or about December 24, 2001. In January 2002,Battle was administratively discharged from the military. Battle also returned to the US on or about February 5, 2002.

The six male members of the group traveled to China in early 2002, with the intent of entering Afghanistan to aid the Taliban. Lacking visas and other documentation, they were turned back, and all but al Saoub then returned again to the United States.

On Thursday, October 3, 2002, a federal grand jury in United States District Court for the District of Oregon, at Portland, Oregon, indicted Battle, Ford, the two Bilals, al Saoub and Lewis. On October 4, 2002, and the FBI in Portland, Oregon, announced the arrest of four of those original six on charges of aiding and, in some cases, trying to join al-Qaeda fighters. Battle, Ford, and Lewis were all arrested that morning in Portland. Muhammad Bilal was arrested at the same time by the FBI in Dearborn, Michigan. The remaining two, Ahmed Bilal and al Saoub, were both considered fugitives. Steitiye was also named by the FBI as an unindicted co-conspirator.

Ali Khalid Steitiye was convicted in 2002 on firearms, fraud, and immigration charges and testified against the others in 2004, as part of a plea agreement in a weapons-possession charge.

Fate of members 
Habis al Saoub joined an al Qaeda cell and was killed by Pakistani forces in October 2003. Ford and Battle are each serving 19-year sentences. Lewis was sentenced to three years in prison. Muhammad Bilal received an eight-year sentence, and Ahmed Bilal got ten years. Hawash was sentenced to seven years and left prison in early 2009.

A 2011 NPR report claimed that some of the people associated with the group were imprisoned in a highly-restrictive Communication Management Unit.

See also
 D.C. Five

References

External links
Picture of six members, minus Hawash

Converts to Islam
Quantified groups of defendants
Islamist groups
Islamic terrorism in the United States
2002 in Portland, Oregon